Czarnia  is a village in Ostrołęka County, Masovian Voivodeship, in east-central Poland. It is the seat of the gmina (administrative district) called Gmina Czarnia.

References

Czarnia
Łomża Governorate
Warsaw Voivodeship (1919–1939)